Woodall is an unincorporated community and census-designated place (CDP) in Cherokee County, Oklahoma, United States. The population was 823 at the 2010 census.

Geography
Woodall is located in western Cherokee County. U.S. Route 62 forms the southern boundary of the CDP, separating it from Zeb. US-62 leads northeast  to Tahlequah, the Cherokee County seat, and southwest  to Muskogee.

Demographics

As of the census of 2000, there were 741 people, 279 households, and 220 families residing in the CDP. The population density was 66.4 people per square mile (25.6/km2). There were 306 housing units at an average density of 27.4/sq mi (10.6/km2). The racial makeup of the CDP was 56.01% White, 33.06% Native American, 0.81% from other races, and 10.12% from two or more races. Hispanic or Latino of any race were 2.16% of the population.

There were 279 households, out of which 36.6% had children under the age of 18 living with them, 65.2% were married couples living together, 7.9% had a female householder with no husband present, and 21.1% were non-families. 18.3% of all households were made up of individuals, and 6.5% had someone living alone who was 65 years of age or older. The average household size was 2.66 and the average family size was 2.98.

In the CDP, the population was spread out, with 26.3% under the age of 18, 8.9% from 18 to 24, 31.3% from 25 to 44, 25.2% from 45 to 64, and 8.2% who were 65 years of age or older. The median age was 36 years. For every 100 females, there were 105.8 males. For every 100 females age 18 and over, there were 101.5 males.

The median income for a household in the CDP was $27,391, and the median income for a family was $33,438. Males had a median income of $24,000 versus $18,214 for females. The per capita income for the CDP was $13,263. About 13.9% of families and 19.1% of the population were below the poverty line, including 20.5% of those under age 18 and 21.6% of those age 65 or over.

References

Census-designated places in Cherokee County, Oklahoma
Census-designated places in Oklahoma